I Was Wrong may refer to:

 "I Was Wrong" (Chris Stapleton song), song by Chris Stapleton from his 2017 album From A Room: Volume 1
 "I Was Wrong" (Social Distortion song), song by Social Distortion from their 1996 album White Light, White Heat, White Trash
 "I Was Wrong" (Celeste Buckingham and Majk Spirit song), 2013 single by Slovak singers Celeste Buckingham and Majk Spirit

See also
I Was Wrong (album), an album by South Korean band 2AM, a repacked version of the mini-album Jugeodo Mot Bonae (aka Can't Let You Go Even If I Die with additional tracks